The 1926 Vanderbilt Commodores football team represented Vanderbilt University during the 1926 college football season. The team's head coach was Dan McGugin, who served his 22nd season as the Commodores' head coach. Commodores had eight wins and lost only one to Alabama, who was named a national champion. Vanderbilt was a member of the Southern Conference, and went 4–1 in conference play. The Commodores played their eight home games at Dudley Field in Nashville, Tennessee. They also played one game in Dallas, Texas vs. Texas and one in Atlanta vs. Georgia Tech.

Schedule

Awards and honors
 All-Southern: Bill Spears; Ox McKibbon

Coaching staff
 Dan McGugin (Michigan '03), head coach
 Josh Cody (Vanderbilt '19), assistant coach
 Lewie Hardage (Vanderbilt '12), backfield coach
 Hek Wakefield (Vanderbilt '24), end coach
 John Weibel (Notre Dame '25), line coach

References

Vanderbilt
Vanderbilt Commodores football seasons
Vanderbilt Commodores football